The Tulane Green Wave college football team competes as part of the NCAA Division I Football Bowl Subdivision (FBS), representing Tulane University in the American Athletic Conference. Since the establishment of the team in 1893, Tulane has appeared in 14 official bowl games and won 6. Its most recent bowl game was the 2020 Famous Idaho Potato Bowl (December), a 27–38 loss against the Nevada Wolf Pack in Boise, Idaho. The 1909 Bacardi Bowl was not sanctioned by the NCAA, and thus the Green Wave do not recognize the bowl appearance.

Key

Bowl games

References

Tulane

Tulane Green Wave bowl games